John Stocchi (born 15 April 1937) is a South African rower. He competed in the men's coxless four event at the 1960 Summer Olympics.

References

1937 births
Living people
South African male rowers
Olympic rowers of South Africa
Rowers at the 1960 Summer Olympics
Rowers from Johannesburg